Kenny Boynton Jr. (born May 12, 1991) is an American professional basketball player for BCM Gravelines-Dunkerque of the LNB Pro A. He played college basketball for the University of Florida.

High school
Boynton attended American Heritage School where he was a standout basketball player. In his senior season, Boynton averaged 33.0 points per game. He finished his high school career as the third-leading scorer in Florida high school basketball history. Kenny was also named to the 2009 McDonald's All-American Boys Game and the Parade All-America first team.

College career
In his first season at Florida, Boynton averaged 14 points per game and 2.7 assists per game.

In Boynton's sophomore season, he had a slight increase in scoring, averaging 14.2 points per game to go along with 2.6 assists per game. He was also named to the All-SEC Second Team.  In the 2011 NCAA Men's Division I Basketball Tournament, Florida reached the Elite Eight, but then lost to the Butler Bulldogs after Boynton missed a three pointer with less than 20 seconds left in the game.

On December 19, 2011, Boynton was named SEC Player of the Week after registering 22 points, two assists, one rebound and a steal in a win over Texas A&M. In Boynton's junior season, Florida once again made the NCAA Tournament, but lost to the Louisville Cardinals in the Elite Eight. On April 5, 2012 Boynton announced that he would return for his senior season at Florida.

In Boynton's senior season, the Gators advanced to the Elite Eight for the third consecutive year where they were defeated by Michigan.

Professional career
After going undrafted in the 2013 NBA draft, Boynton was signed to the Lakers summer league team on July 2, 2013 but did not make the team.  

He ultimately signed with Barak Netanya of Israel's Ligat HaAl. He got released after playing only 5 games with Netanya. On November 27, 2013 Boynton signed a 1-month deal with Hapoel Gilboa Galil.

For the 2016–17 season, Boynton signed with Nizhny Novgorod of the VTB United League and Eurocup. He signed with the Shenzhen Leopards of the Chinese Basketball Association on September 6, 2018.

On January 6, 2023, he signed with BCM Gravelines-Dunkerque of the LNB Pro A.

References

External links
Israeli League profile
Florida Gators bio

1991 births
Living people
American expatriate basketball people in France
American expatriate basketball people in Israel
American expatriate basketball people in Russia
American expatriate basketball people in Turkey
American expatriate basketball people in China
American Heritage School (Florida) alumni
American men's basketball players
Basketball players from Florida
BC Nizhny Novgorod players
BCM Gravelines players
Florida Gators men's basketball players
Hapoel Gilboa Galil Elyon players
McDonald's High School All-Americans
Parade High School All-Americans (boys' basketball)
People from Plantation, Florida
Point guards
Shenzhen Leopards players
SOMB Boulogne-sur-Mer players
Sportspeople from Broward County, Florida
Yeşilgiresun Belediye players